Michael Duane "Bo" McLaughlin (born October 23, 1953) is a former baseball relief pitcher Major League Baseball relief pitcher from 1976 to 1982 for the Houston Astros, Atlanta Braves, and Oakland Athletics. McLaughlin is best known for being hit by a line drive that almost ended his career and his alias "Grim Bimbledon".

On May 26, McLaughlin was pitching in the eighth inning of a game against the Chicago White Sox. He threw a sinker to Harold Baines, who hit a line drive into McLaughlin's face. The pitch broke McLaughlin's left cheekbone and his eye socket in five different places. McLaughlin vomited blood and went into shock. It took two surgeries to wire his cheekbone and left eye socket, and doctors at Oakland's Merritt Hospital feared that he would not survive the night. McLaughlin recovered to play a few games in September that year and then spent 1982 with the A's. He was demoted to the Minors in 1983 and played three seasons of Triple-A baseball. He later went into the real estate business and coached in the minor leagues for the Chicago Cubs and Baltimore Orioles systems before moving on to his current job with the Rockies.

As a hitter, McLaughlin went hitless in his six-year major league career. He had 37 at-bats without a hit, reaching base three times by bases on balls in 45 plate appearances.

Notes

External links

1953 births
Living people
Houston Astros players
Atlanta Braves players
Oakland Athletics players
Major League Baseball pitchers
Baseball players from California
Columbus Astros players
Memphis Blues players
Charleston Charlies players
Richmond Braves players
Tacoma Tigers players
Las Vegas Stars (baseball) players
Phoenix Giants players
Lipscomb Bisons baseball players
Colorado Rockies (baseball) coaches
Major League Baseball pitching coaches